Prubi is a railway station on the Hughenden-Winton railway line in the locality of Corfield in the Shire of Winton, Queensland, Australia. It is to the immediate east of the Kennedy Developmental Road.

History 
The name Prubi means "plains".

References

Railway stations in Queensland
Shire of Winton